Nawabshah Airport  is an airport located about  southwest of Nawabshah, a city in the Pakistani province of Sindh. Built by the British Raj, Nawabshah Airport does not handle any scheduled passenger flights, but it has been used as a diversion airport. It is also used by the Pakistan Air Force.

History
The airport dates to the time of the British Raj. In the early 1960s, a concrete runway was laid. A new terminal building was completed in October 1992, and a new apron and runway were commissioned in 1998.

Nawabshah Airport does not receive any scheduled flights as of November 2016. It has been used as a diversion airport for aircraft suffering mechanical problems or when Jinnah International Airport in Karachi is closed, during the 2014 Jinnah International Airport attack for example. In addition, the Pakistan Air Force operates at the airport alongside the Pakistan Civil Aviation Authority.

Infrastructure
It cannot handle instrument landing system approaches.

See also 
 
 Transport in Pakistan

References

External links 

Airports in Sindh
Shaheed Benazir Abad District